Billboard Top Rock'n'Roll Hits: 1972 is a compilation album released by Rhino Records in 1989, featuring ten hit recordings from 1972.

All tracks on the album reached the top 3 on the Billboard Hot 100, with seven of the songs going to number one on the chart. The album was certified Gold by the RIAA on October 19, 1999.

Track listing

References 

Billboard Top Rock'n'Roll Hits albums
1989 compilation albums
Pop rock compilation albums